John Patrick Cuff  (June 1864 – September 16, 1916) was a professional baseball player who played catcher in the Major Leagues in 1884 for the Baltimore Monumentals of the Union Association. He continued to play in the minor leagues through 1890.

External links

1864 births
1916 deaths
Major League Baseball catchers
Baltimore Monumentals players
19th-century baseball players
Bridgeport Giants players
Jersey City Skeeters players
Long Island A's players
Newark Little Giants players
Wilkes-Barre Barons (baseball) players
Baseball players from Jersey City, New Jersey
Meriden Silvermen players